Sophie Schwartz is a Swiss neuroscientist who is a professor at the University of Geneva. She studies the neural mechanisms that underpin experience-dependent changes in the human brain.

Early life and education 
Schwartz is from Switzerland. She was an undergraduate student at the University of Geneva, where she majored in biology. She moved to Lausanne as a graduate student, working toward a second bachelor's degree in psychology. She studied dreams through neurophysical investigations at the University of Lausanne. After completing her doctorate, Schwartz joined the Institute of Cognitive Neuroscience as a postdoctoral researcher.

Career 
Schwartz joined the faculty at the University of Geneva and was eventually promoted to the executive committee of the Brain and Behaviour Laboratory and Head of the Laboratory for Neuroimaging of Sleep and Cognition. She investigates the fundamental mechanisms that determine experience-dependent changes in the brain. She is interested in models of learning and neural plasticity and their offline replay. To better understand these phenomena, Schwartz has created novel behavioural tasks, which she combines with brain imaging techniques such as functional magnetic resonance imaging and high-density electroencephalography. Using EEG, Schwartz has proposed that dreams serve to simulate frightening situations to better prepare for real life dangers.

Schwartz has studied brain activity during sleep, and showed that the brain processes information during deep sleep, evaluating information and retaining the most crucial concepts. The mechanisms that underpin this memory consolidation are signals sent between the hippocampus, which stores temporary information, and other parts of the brain.

Selected publications

References 

Swiss women neuroscientists
University of Lausanne alumni
University of Geneva alumni
1965 births
Living people
Academic staff of the University of Geneva
21st-century Swiss physicians
21st-century Swiss women scientists